Trajan Shaka Langdon (born May 13, 1976) is an American basketball executive and former professional player. He is the current general manager of the New Orleans Pelicans of the National Basketball Association (NBA). A  and  shooting guard, he first gained fame in the U.S. while playing college basketball at Duke University.

Following a three-year NBA stint, Langdon had a very successful career in Europe. A three-time All-EuroLeague Team member and the EuroLeague Final Four MVP in 2008, he won two EuroLeague titles with CSKA Moscow in 2006 and 2008. 
 
In March 2016, he was named the assistant general manager of the Brooklyn Nets, serving in the role until May 2019, when he was named the general manager of the Pelicans.

Early career
Born in Palo Alto, California, Langdon moved to Anchorage, Alaska soon after. During his high school career, Langdon attended Steller Secondary School, and played with East Anchorage High School. He set the Alaska 4A state record of 2,200 career points scored, and was a 3-time Alaskan State Player of the Year.

He led East Anchorage to the 1994 Alaskan State Championship, and he played in the McDonald's All-American Game, where he won the 3-point shooting contest.

Langdon also played high school baseball. Although his seasons were only twelve games long, as a senior he hit .333 with four home runs and 12 RBIs. In the league championship game, he gave up only four hits and struck out eleven batters.

College career
After high school, Langdon moved on to play NCAA Division I college basketball at Duke, where he set the school record for the most career 3-point field goals made (which was later broken by JJ Redick in 2006), earning him the nickname, "The Alaskan Assassin". A major knee injury kept him sidelined for his entire sophomore year, so he finished his college career as a fifth year guard.

In the 1999 NCAA Men's Division I Basketball Tournament championship game, with Duke down 1 point to the UConn Huskies, with 5.4 seconds to go in the game, Langdon attempted to drive the ball into the lane, and committed a traveling violation that turned the ball over to UConn. Analysts, as well as Langdon himself, credited the defense of Ricky Moore, who was considered the top defensive player in the tournament, for forcing the travel.

Baseball career
A baseball scout discovered Langdon playing catch with his father in the parking lot of their hotel during Langdon's recruiting trip to Duke and was immediately impressed. Langdon was selected in the 6th round of the 1994 Major League Baseball draft out of high school by the San Diego Padres, ahead of such eventual All-Stars as Carl Pavano and Plácido Polanco. At the time he was the highest drafted player ever out of Alaska. He signed with the Padres and received a $230,000 signing bonus. Because NCAA rules at the time prevented a player from receiving a scholarship in one sport while playing another professionally, Langdon had to play basketball at Duke without a scholarship while playing Minor League Baseball during the summer. In three seasons in the minors, he played in 50 games for the Spokane Indians and Idaho Falls Braves.

Professional career
Langdon was selected by the NBA's Cleveland Cavaliers in the 1999 NBA Draft. Langdon made his professional debut with the Cavaliers on November 2, 1999, when he became the first Alaskan to play in the NBA. Following a three-year career with the Cavaliers, Langdon moved to Europe to play for the Italian League club Benetton Treviso for the 2002–03 season.

The following season, after being waived by the Los Angeles Clippers in the preseason, he originally signed with and briefly played for the Long Beach Jam before he moved to the Turkish League powerhouse Efes Pilsen. For the 2004–05 season, he moved on to the Russian League club Dynamo Moscow, before moving across town to CSKA Moscow for the 2005–06 season. Langdon was named to the All-EuroLeague Second Team for the 2005–06 season. CSKA won the EuroLeague championship that same season.

The following season, he helped CSKA return to the EuroLeague championship game, where they lost to Greek power Panathinaikos, on the Greek team's home court. In the process, he was named to the All-EuroLeague First Team for the 2006–07 season, a feat that he repeated in the 2007–08 season. On May 4, 2008, he was named the EuroLeague Final Four MVP, after again winning the EuroLeague title with CSKA.

On October 7, 2006, Langdon led his CSKA Moscow team to a 94–75 win over the Clippers, in an NBA Europe Live Tour exhibition game. Coincidentally, he played against his former Duke University teammate Elton Brand, who was playing for the Clippers at that time. He led all scorers in the game with 17 points.

In June 2011, he announced his retirement from playing professional basketball. He made his announcement two days after helping CSKA to its ninth consecutive Russian championship.

National team career
After graduating from Duke, with degrees in mathematics and history, Langdon played for the USA national basketball team at the 1998 FIBA World Championship, winning the bronze medal.

Post-playing career
After his playing days ended, Langdon was a scout for the San Antonio Spurs, from 2012 to 2015. On March 8, 2016, he was named the assistant general manager of the Brooklyn Nets. On May 19, 2019, Langdon was named the general manager of the New Orleans Pelicans.

Career statistics

NBA

Regular season

|-
| align="left" | 1999–00
| align="left" | Cleveland
| 10 || 0 || 14.5 || .375 || .421 || 1.000 || 1.5 || 1.1 || .5 || .0 || 4.9
|-
| align="left" | 2000–01
| align="left" | Cleveland
| 65 || 5 || 17.2 || .431 || .411 || .895 || 1.4 || 1.2 || .6 || .1 || 6.0
|-
| align="left" | 2001–02
| align="left" | Cleveland
| 44 || 0 || 10.8 || .398 || .365 || .913 || 1.3 || 1.4 || .3 || .1 || 4.8
|- class="sortbottom"
| colspan="2" align="center" | Career
| 119 || 5 || 14.6 || .416 || .396 || .910 || 1.3 || 1.3 || .5 || .1 || 5.4

EuroLeague

|-
| style="text-align:left;"| 2002–03
| style="text-align:left;"| Benetton
| 21 || 19 || 28.6 || .540 || .511 || .759 || 2.7 || 1.7 || 1.6 || .1 || 14.8 || 13.4
|-
| style="text-align:left;"| 2003–04
| style="text-align:left;"| Efes Pilsen
| 20 || 19 || 33.1 || .461 || .391 || .864 || 3.0 || 1.6 || 1.5 || .2 || 14.3 || 13.0
|-
| style="text-align:left;background:#AFE6BA;"| 2005–06†
| style="text-align:left;" rowspan=6| CSKA Moscow
| 24 || 24 || 31.8 || .453 || .390 || .860 || 3.1 || 1.5 || 1.3 || .2 || 12.8 || 11.6
|-
| style="text-align:left;"| 2006–07
| 25 || 25 || 29.5 || .475 || .420 || style="background:#CFECEC;"|.925 || 4.0 || 1.0 || 1.6 || .2 || 13.5 || 14.6
|-
| style="text-align:left;background:#AFE6BA;"| 2007–08†
| 25 || 25 || 29.1 || .512 || .458 || .884 || 3.3 || .9 || 1.2 || .1 || 12.6 || 13.0
|-
| style="text-align:left;"| 2008–09
| 21 || 21 || 28.8 || .494 || .432 || .878 || 2.7 || 1.3 || 1.0 || .0 || 10.6 || 11.2
|-
| style="text-align:left;"| 2009–10
| 21 || 21 || 32.2 || .505 || .470 || .913 || 3.0 || 1.1 || 1.4 || .0 || 15.0 || 15.6
|-
| style="text-align:left;"| 2010–11
| 10 || 9 || 27.5 || .397 || .229 || .708 || 2.2 || .5 || .2 || .0 || 8.3 || 4.5
|- class="sortbottom"
| colspan="2" align="center" | Career
| 167 || 164 || 30.2 || .486 || .427 || .868 || 3.1 || 1.3 || 1.3 || .1 || 13.0 || 12.7

Personal life
Langdon is the son of social worker Gladys, and Dr. Steve Langdon, a professor of anthropology at the University of Alaska Anchorage. Trajan traveled with his father on many anthropological trips within southeastern Alaska. His father studied the Indigenous Nation of southeastern Alaska known as the Tlingit Nation.

Notes

References

External links

 Trajan Langdon at euroleague.net
 Trajan Langdon at legabasket.it  
 Trajan Langdon at pbleague.ru
 Trajan Langdon at tblstat.net

1976 births
Living people
1998 FIBA World Championship players
African-American basketball players
All-American college men's basketball players
American expatriate basketball people in Italy
American expatriate basketball people in Russia
American expatriate basketball people in Turkey
American men's basketball players
Anadolu Efes S.K. players
Basketball players from Alaska
Basketball players from California
BC Dynamo Moscow players
Brooklyn Nets executives
Cleveland Cavaliers draft picks
Cleveland Cavaliers players
Duke Blue Devils men's basketball players
Idaho Falls Braves players
Long Beach Jam players
McDonald's High School All-Americans
New Orleans Pelicans executives
Pallacanestro Treviso players
Parade High School All-Americans (boys' basketball)
PBC CSKA Moscow players
Shooting guards
Spokane Indians players
Sportspeople from Anchorage, Alaska
Sportspeople from Palo Alto, California
United States men's national basketball team players
21st-century African-American sportspeople
20th-century African-American sportspeople